Tillie is an unincorporated community in Letcher County, Kentucky, United States. The Tillie Post Office operated from 1890 to 1953.

References

Unincorporated communities in Letcher County, Kentucky
Unincorporated communities in Kentucky